Henry William Allan (December 29, 1843 – March 10, 1913) was a Canadian politician, merchant and produce dealer. He was elected in 1891 as a Member of the House of Commons of Canada for the riding of Essex South, Ontario representing the Liberal Party. He was defeated in the 1878 election when he ran in the riding of Norfolk South. Prior to his federal political experience, he was elected as a councillor in Norfolk County, Ontario and as reeve in Walsingham, Ontario.

References 
 

1843 births
1913 deaths
Liberal Party of Canada MPs
Members of the House of Commons of Canada from Ontario
Pre-Confederation Ontario people